Lawrence Park may refer to:

People 
Lawrence Park (art historian) (1873–1924), American art historian, architect, and genealogist

Places 
Lawrence Park, Toronto, Canada
Lawrence Park Township, Erie County, Pennsylvania, United States
Lawrence Park Historic District, Bronxville, New York, United States
Lawrence Gardens, Lahore, Pakistan